
Year 469 BC was a year of the pre-Julian Roman calendar. At the time, it was known as the Year of the Consulship of Priscus and Caeliomontanus (or, less frequently, year 285 Ab urbe condita). The denomination 469 BC for this year has been used since the early medieval period, when the Anno Domini calendar era became the prevalent method in Europe for naming years.

Events 
 By place 
 Greece 
 The island of Naxos wishes to secede from the Delian League, but is blockaded by Athens and forced to surrender. Naxos becomes a tribute-paying member of the Delian League. This action is considered high-handed and resented by the other Greek city states.
 Themistocles, after being exiled from Athens, makes his way across the Aegean to Magnesia, an inland Ionian city under Persian rule.

Births 
 Socrates, Athenian philosopher (approximate date) (d. 399 BC)

Deaths 
 King Yuan of Zhou(Ji Ren), 27th King of the Zhou Dynasty of China
Duke Jing of Song, 28th ruler of state of  Song
Duke Chu of Wey, 30th and 33rd ruler of state of Wey
 Leotychides, king of Sparta (b. 545 BC)

References